Cabra may refer to:

Ireland
Cabra, Dublin, a district in north Dublin, Ireland
Cabra, County Down, a townland in County Down, Northern Ireland
Cabragh, Fertiana, County Tipperary, a townland in County Tipperary, Ireland
Cabra Castle, a castle in County Cavan

Spain
Cabra, Spain, a municipality in the province of Córdoba, Andalucía, Spain
Cabra (river), a river in northern Spain
Cabra de Mora, a municipality in the province of Teruel, Aragón, Spain
Battle of Cabra, a battle fought by El Cid

Australia
Cabramatta, New South Wales, a suburb of Sydney
Cabra Dominican College, a school in Adelaide, South Australia

Philippines
Cabra Island, an island in the Lubang, Occidental Mindoro province